Honokohau may refer to the place-names in Hawaii, United States: 
Honokohau Harbor - A marina in western Hawaii
Honokōhau Settlement and Kaloko-Honokōhau National Historical Park - A National Historic Park in western Hawaii
Honokohau Valley -  A valley and the bay that follows, in western Maui
Honokōhau in Hawaiian means "the bay where waters congregate".